Kerry Condon (born 9 January 1983) is an Irish actress. She was the youngest actress to play Ophelia in a Royal Shakespeare Company production of Hamlet (2001–2002). She played Octavia of the Julii in Rome (2005–2007), Stacey Ehrmantraut in Better Call Saul (2015–2022), and was the voice of the artificial intelligence entity F.R.I.D.A.Y. in various films in the Marvel Cinematic Universe.

Condon has collaborated with Martin McDonagh in the plays The Lieutenant of Inishmore (2001) and The Cripple of Inishmaan (2009), as well as the films Three Billboards Outside Ebbing, Missouri (2017) and The Banshees of Inisherin (2022). For her performance in the latter she received several accolades, including the BAFTA Award for Best Actress in a Supporting Role, and was nominated for the Academy Award for Best Supporting Actress.

Career
In 2001 at the age of 18, Condon landed the role of Mairead in The Lieutenant of Inishmore by Martin McDonagh which she performed at the Royal Shakespeare Company and in 2006 at the Lyceum Theatre in New York. For the production she recorded the song "The Patriot Game" with The Pogues. That same year, Condon played the role of Ophelia in Hamlet, making her the youngest actress to ever play that role for the RSC. In 2009, she appeared in another play by Martin McDonagh, The Cripple of Inishmaan, for which she won a Lucille Lortel Award for Outstanding Featured Actress in a Play and a Drama Desk Award for Outstanding Ensemble Performance.

Condon's movie roles include Kate Kelly, Ned Kelly's outlaw sister, in 2003's Ned Kelly and an appearance in the 2003 Irish independent film Intermission with Cillian Murphy, Kelly Macdonald, and Colin Farrell. She was in the 2005 Jet Li action-thriller Unleashed. In 2005, Condon co-starred as Octavia of the Julii, sister of the Roman Emperor Augustus, in the HBO/BBC series Rome.

She then appeared as Masha, a Tolstoian, in The Last Station, a film about the last months of Leo Tolstoy's life with Helen Mirren and Christopher Plummer, before playing jockey Rosie Shanahan in the 2012 TV series Luck. Condon appeared in the season 4 premiere of the post-apocalyptic zombie drama The Walking Dead playing the role of the character Clara, which aired 13 October 2013. She voiced the artificial intelligence F.R.I.D.A.Y., Iron Man's replacement for J.A.R.V.I.S. in the Marvel Studios films Avengers: Age of Ultron, Captain America: Civil War, Spider-Man: Homecoming, Avengers: Infinity War, and Avengers: Endgame.

After reuniting with Martin McDonagh in the 2017 film Three Billboards Outside Ebbing, Missouri, Condon played a major role in McDonagh's 2022 film The Banshees of Inisherin as the long-suffering sister of Colin Farrell's character. Condon's performance in the film earned her immense critical praise, garnering several accolades, including a win for the BAFTA Award for Best Actress in a Supporting Role and nominations for the Academy Award for Best Supporting Actress, the Golden Globe Award for Best Supporting Actress–Motion Picture and the Screen Actors Guild Award for Outstanding Performance by a Female Actor in a Supporting Role.

Filmography

Film

Television

Theme park attractions

Awards and nominations

References

External links 
 
 
 

Living people
1983 births
20th-century Irish actresses
21st-century Irish actresses
Actors from County Tipperary
Best Supporting Actress AACTA International Award winners
Best Supporting Actress BAFTA Award winners
Drama Desk Award winners
Irish child actresses
Irish film actresses
Irish Shakespearean actresses
Irish television actresses
People from Thurles